Robert Zebelyan (born 31 March 1984) is an Armenian former football forward.

Zebelyan was born in Sochi, Soviet Union, and raised in Russia. Robert played for the Armenia national football team, having debuted for the team on 15 November 2006 in an away Euro 2008 qualifying match against Finland.

Achievements
Russian First Division silver medals with Kuban Krasnodar: 2006
Russian First Division second top goalscorer with 23 goals: 2006

External links

Profile at championat.ru

Living people
1984 births
Sportspeople from Sochi
Russian people of Armenian descent
Armenian footballers
Russian footballers
Armenia international footballers
Armenian expatriate footballers
Expatriate footballers in Russia
Expatriate footballers in Belarus
Expatriate footballers in Kazakhstan
Russian Premier League players
FC Zhemchuzhina Sochi players
FC Kuban Krasnodar players
FC Khimki players
FC Baltika Kaliningrad players
FC Dinamo Minsk players
FC Tobol players
Association football forwards